HMCS Mulgrave (pennant J313) was a  that served with the Royal Canadian Navy during the Second World War. Entering service in 1942, the minesweeper took part in the Battle of the Atlantic and the invasion of Normandy. While sweeping for naval mines off France in 1944, the vessel hit one. The ship was towed back to port where Mulgrave was declared a constructive total loss. Laid up until the end of the war, the minesweeper was broken up in 1947.

Design and description
They came in two versions powered by different engines; those with a diesel engines and those with vertical triple-expansion steam engines. Mulgrave was of the latter design and was larger than her diesel-engined cousins. She had a complement of 6 officers and 77 enlisted.

Mulgrave had two vertical triple-expansion steam engines, each driving one shaft, using steam provided by two Admiralty three-drum boilers.

Mulgrave was armed with a single quick-firing (QF) 12-pounder 12 cwt HA gun mounted forward. The ship was also fitted with a QF 2-pounder Mark VIII aft and were eventually fitted with single-mounted QF 20 mm Oerlikon guns on the bridge wings. The 2-pounder gun was later replaced with a twin 20 mm Oerlikon mount. Those ships assigned to convoy duty had two depth charge launchers and four chutes to deploy the 40 depth charges they carried.

Operational history
The minesweeper was ordered as part of the 1941–1942 construction programme. The ship's keel was laid down on 15 December 1941 by Port Arthur Shipbuilding Co at their yard in Port Arthur, Ontario. Named for a community in Nova Scotia, Mulgrave was launched on 2 May 1942. The ship was commissioned on 4 November 1942 at Port Arthur.

Mulgrave arrived at Halifax, Nova Scotia on 30 November and was assigned to Halifax Force, the local patrol and escort force. In June 1943, the ship switched to the Western Local Escort Force as a convoy escort as part of the escort group W2 in the Battle of the Atlantic. The minesweeper remained with the unit until February 1944, when the ship was sent to Europe as part of Canada's contribution to the invasion of Normandy. Crossing the Atlantic Ocean via the Azores, Mulgrave went aground at Horta, Azores and had to be towed to Greenock, Scotland. The ship was repaired at Ardrossan before joining the 32nd Minesweeping Flotilla at Plymouth in April. In June, the ship transferred to the 31st Minesweeping Flotilla.

During the invasion, the minesweepers swept and marked channels through the German minefields leading into the invasion beaches in the American sector, with Mulgrave acting as danlayer for the group. The 31st Minesweeping Flotilla swept channel 3 on 6 June. The minesweepers spent the following months clearing the shipping lanes between the United Kingdom and mainland Europe. On 8 October 1944, the 31st Minesweeping Flotilla was sweeping for mines off Le Havre, France when Mulgrave suffered an explosion. The minesweeper had hit a mine and after damage control efforts saved the ship, sister ship  took the vessel in tow and brought her to Le Havre.

Mulgrave was towed to Portsmouth where the vessel was declared a constructive total loss. The Royal Canadian Navy placed the vessel in reserve at Falmouth in January 1945. Mulgrave was paid off on 7 June 1945 at Falmouth. In May 1947, the minesweeper was taken to Llanelly, Wales, beached and broken up.

References

Notes

Citations

Sources

External links
 

 

Bangor-class minesweepers of the Royal Canadian Navy
Ships built in Ontario
1942 ships
World War II minesweepers of Canada